Indolestes pulcherrimus is a species of spreadwing in the damselfly family Lestidae. The species was known only from in Kodagu district, Karnataka. Later it is found in forest swamps in Wayanad district, Kerala too.

Description and habitat
It is a medium-sized damselfly with blue eyes. Its prothorax is brownish above and bluish on the sides. Its thorax is dark metallic green on dorsum with a narrow blue mid-dorsal stripe. Sides are blue, marked with a large black spot behind the lateral suture, followed by a smaller one in the middle. Wings are transparent with blackish-brown pterostigma. Abdomen is azure blue on the sides, marked with black on dorsum. The mark on segment 2 looks like a thistle head. Segments 8 is black.  The apical half of segment 9 and whole of segment 10 are azure blue.

Female is similar to the male; differs only in the colors. Segment 8-10 are dark brown.

See also 
 List of odonates of India
 List of odonata of Kerala

References

External links

Lestidae
Articles created by Qbugbot
Insects described in 1924